Rafael Matos and João Menezes were the defending champions but chose not to defend their title.

Orlando Luz and Felipe Meligeni Alves won the title after defeating Hernán Casanova and Roberto Ortega Olmedo 6–3, 6–4 in the final.

Seeds

Draw

References

External links
 Main draw

Iași Open - Doubles